The following is a list of professional wrestling attendance records in Europe. Unlike other parts of the world, almost all of the records set during the period contemporary to the "Pioneer-era" (1900s-1940s) in American wrestling still remain. A number of these events are also among the highest attended pro wrestling shows of all-time. According to this list, these include the stadium shows in Athens, Greece, especially those headlined by Jim Londos, held at the Apostolos Nikolaidis Stadium and Panathenaic Stadium from the late-1920s to early-1970s. Rafvela vs. Felix Lamban, promoted by Luis Bamala, was held at the Estadio Metropolitano on August 24, 1957, then the largest football stadium in Spain, drawing a crowd of over 35,000. All but fourteen of the events have been held in Greece, while six have been held in Bulgaria, four in Spain, two in Ireland, and one each in Denmark and Italy.

In the 21st century, Europe is dominated by the American professional wrestling promotion World Wrestling Entertainment which has controlled the industry in North America since 2002. As the World Wrestling Federation, it became the first national promotion in the U.S. during the 1980s wrestling boom. Its first-ever show in mainland Europe took place on October 23, 1987, at the sold-out Bercy de Paris in Paris, France. The main event was a match between Harley Race and Junkyard Dog featuring André the Giant as special guest referee. The event was attended by 12,000 people and televised on Canal+. In the modern-era, the highest attended shows are from WWE's weekly television programs WWE Raw and WWE SmackDown, with the June 18, 2005 episode of WWE SmackDown in Dublin, Ireland being the company's most attended wrestling event in Europe. Only two of the attendances listed are non-WWE events, with the European Wrestling Federation and Nu-Wrestling Evolution being the only European-based promotions on the list.

Events and attendances

Historical

See also

List of professional wrestling attendance records
List of professional wrestling attendance records in Japan
List of professional wrestling attendance records in Puerto Rico
List of professional wrestling attendance records in the United Kingdom
List of WWE attendance records
List of professional wrestling attendance records in Oceania

Footnotes

References

External links
Supercards & Tournaments: Europe
Wrestling attendance records in Europe at Wrestlingdata.com

E
Attendance records
Attendance records